Saint John Evangelical Lutheran Church is located in New Fane, Wisconsin. It was added to the National Register of Historic Places in 1986. The church is affiliated with the Lutheran Church–Missouri Synod.

History
The church was built with stone from what would become the Kettle Moraine State Forest. In the 1920s, the church steeple was struck by lightning was replaced with one smaller in height. The church underwent a change of its name in 1965, changing from The German Lutheran Church: St. Johannes to its current name.

References

German-American culture in Wisconsin
Churches on the National Register of Historic Places in Wisconsin
Lutheran churches in Wisconsin
Churches in Fond du Lac County, Wisconsin
Gothic Revival church buildings in Wisconsin
Churches completed in 1870
Lutheran Church–Missouri Synod churches
National Register of Historic Places in Fond du Lac County, Wisconsin